The Wisdom Bridge book authored by Kamlesh Patel, the global guide of Heartfulness talks of so called nine principles on effective parenting. This book has also been recognised as one of the winner of golden book awards for the year 2023.

Book Details 

Kamlesh Patel, a spiritual leader and the global guide of Heartfulness also known as Daaji among his followers authored this book.  The book reflects on holistic growth of children focussing on their spiritual, mental, physical and emotional nourishment.   The book also covers the concept of "Halo Parenting" which involves groups of people other than parents who can also prove to be torch bearers for the child's wisdom. The book also stresses on the role of Epigenetics in the nurturing of an individual.

Publication 

The Wisdom Bridge book is published by Penguin Random House India.

Reception 

The book was appreciated by Pullela Gopichand (Chief Coach, Indian Badminton), Suresh Prabhu (Indian Politician) and Milee Ashwarya, publisher of Ebury Publishing and Vintage.

References 

Parenting advice books
2022 non-fiction books